Chen Wei-Chen (born 24 May 1966) is a Taiwanese baseball player who competed in the 1992 Summer Olympics.

He was part of the Chinese Taipei baseball team which won the silver medal. He played as outfielder.

External links

profile

1966 births
Living people
Asian Games competitors for Chinese Taipei
Sinon Bulls coaches
Baseball outfielders
Baseball players at the 1990 Asian Games
Baseball players at the 1992 Summer Olympics
Fu Jen Catholic University alumni
Medalists at the 1992 Summer Olympics
Olympic baseball players of Taiwan
Olympic medalists in baseball
Olympic silver medalists for Taiwan
People from Chiayi County
Taiwanese baseball players
Sinon Bulls managers